Hiroko Uchida-Yokoyama (born 11 February 1936) is a Japanese athlete. She competed in the women's discus throw at the 1960 Summer Olympics and the 1964 Summer Olympics.

References

1936 births
Living people
Sportspeople from Kumamoto Prefecture
Japanese female discus throwers
Olympic female javelin throwers
Olympic athletes of Japan
Athletes (track and field) at the 1960 Summer Olympics
Athletes (track and field) at the 1964 Summer Olympics
Asian Games gold medalists for Japan
Asian Games medalists in athletics (track and field)
Athletes (track and field) at the 1958 Asian Games
Medalists at the 1958 Asian Games
Japan Championships in Athletics winners
20th-century Japanese women